|}

The Scilly Isles Novices' Chase is a Grade 1 National Hunt steeplechase in Great Britain, which is open to horses aged five years or older. It is run at Sandown Park over a distance of around two miles and four furlongs (2 miles 4 furlongs 10 yards, or 4,033 metres). During its running there are seventeen fences to be jumped. The race is for novice chasers, and it is scheduled to take place each year in late January or early February. It was sponsored by The Tote in 2011 and run as the Totepool Challengers Novices' Chase, and by Betfair in 2012 and run as the Betfair Novices' Chase. The 2013 running was sponsored by Betfred and run as the Betfred Mobile Lotto Challengers' Novice Chase. The Scilly Isles name was restored to the race title from 2014.

The race was first run in 1964 and takes its name from the Scilly Isles, Surrey, an area near to Sandown Park racecourse.

Prior to 1988 the distance of the race was 2 miles and 18 yards (3,235 metres).

Records
<div style="font-size:90%">
Leading jockey since 1964 (4 wins):
 Barry Geraghty – Punchestowns (2010), Captain Conan (2013), Oscar Whisky (2014), Defi Du Seuil (2019)
 Daryl Jacob -  Gitane Du Berlais (2015), Bristol De Mai (2016), Top Notch (2017), Terrefort (2018)

Leading trainer since 1964 (6 wins):
 Nicky Henderson – First Bout (1987), Punchestowns (2010), Captain Conan (2013), Oscar Whisky (2014), Top Notch (2017), Terrefort (2018)</div>

Winners

See also
 Horse racing in Great Britain
 List of British National Hunt races

References
 Racing Post:
 
 pedigreequery.com – Scilly Isles Novices' Chase – Sandown.''

External links
 Race Recordings 

National Hunt races in Great Britain
Sandown Park Racecourse
National Hunt chases
Recurring sporting events established in 1964
1964 establishments in England